Diario (Italian, Spanish "Diary") and El Diario (Spanish, "The Daily") may refer to:

Newspapers, periodicals and websites

El Diario (Argentina)
Diario (Aruba)
El Diario (La Paz), Bolivia
Diario Extra (Costa Rica)
Diario Libre, Dominican Republic
El Diario de Hoy, El Salvador
Diario de Centro América, Guatemala
Diario (magazine) (1996–2009), Italy
El Diario de Juárez, Ciudad Juárez, Chihuahua, Mexico
Diario de Morelia, Mexico
El Diario de Nuevo Laredo, Mexico
Diario de Yucatán, Mexico
O Diário (1976–1990), Portugal
E-Dyario, Philippines
El Diario Vasco, Basque Country, Spain
El Diario (Spain)
El Diario La Prensa, New York City, United States
El Diario de El Paso, Texas, United States
El Diario (Uruguay)

Other uses
Diario (Cultura Profética album), 2002
Diário, a 2005 album by Mafalda Arnauth

See also
Diario Extra (disambiguation)
Diario Oficial (disambiguation)
Diary (disambiguation)